Don Waterman is a retired NASCAR Winston Cup Series race car driver whose career spanned from 1980 to 1983.

Career
The primary vehicle for Waterman was the self-owned #38 St. John's Auto Parts Buick.

Only three races were spent inside an Oldsmobile machine. His only "top ten" finish came at the January running of the 1981 Winston Western 500. After starting an average of 26th place and finishing an average of 20th, Waterman has earned a total career savings of $19,285 ($ when adjusted for inflation). DNFs made up about 44% of Waterman's career. He raced in eight road courses and only one intermediate oval track.

Waterman's ultimate retirement from motorsports came on June 30, 1991, at a NASCAR Winston West Series race at Portland Speedway titled the 1991 Winston 200. He improved on his 11th-place start with a seventh-place finish and received his prize winnings of $1,100 after 198 laps of racing ($ when adjusted for inflation).

References

1950 births
NASCAR drivers
Racing drivers from Portland, Oregon
Living people